Bilgetegin was a Turkic officer, who was the Samanid governor of Ghazna from 12 November 966 to 975. He was successor of Abu Ishaq Ibrahim of Ghazna.

On 12 November 966, when Abu Ishaq Ibrahim of Ghazna died, he left no child for throne of the Ghaznavid dynasty. Turkic leaders and princes chose Bilgetegin as Samanid ruler of Ghazna in November 966. He died in 975 during his siege of Lawik-ruled Gardez. Böritigin of Ghazni was his successor.

References

Sources 
 
 
 

975 deaths
10th-century births
Ghilman
Samanid governors of Ghazna
10th-century Turkic people
Slaves of the Samanid Empire